Battle of Tongues is a 2013 South Korean television program starring Kim Gura, Rhyu Si-min. It airs on JTBC on Thursday at 22:50 beginning 21February 2013.

Host 

 Kim Gura
 Park Hyung-joon
 Rhee Cheolhee
Former 
 Lee Yoon-Seok
 Park Ji-yoon
 Choi Hee
 Roh Hoe-chan
 Hong Seok-cheon
 Kim Hee-chul
 Heo Ji-woong
 Kang Yong-suk
 Lee Jun-seok
 Seo Jang-hoon
 Jang Do-Youn
 Choi Jingi
 Jun Won-tchack
 Rhyu Si-min

Awards and nominations

References

External links
 

2013 South Korean television series debuts
Korean-language television shows
JTBC original programming